Azahara Muñoz Guijarro (born 19 November 1987) is a Spanish professional golfer on the U.S.-based LPGA Tour and Ladies European Tour.

Amateur career
Muñoz was born in Málaga, Andalusia in southern Spain and had a successful amateur career in both Europe and the United States. She won the 2002 Spanish Amateur title at age 14, the 2004 Girls Amateur Championship, and was the 2009 British Ladies Amateur champion.  Additionally, she was runner-up to Amanda Blumenherst at the 2008 U.S. Women's Amateur in Eugene, Oregon, and was a member of Europe's Junior Solheim Cup Team in 2002, 2003, and 2005.

At Arizona State, she was the 2008 NCAA Individual Champion in her junior year, winning by making a  putt at the first hole of a playoff against UCLA's Tiffany Joh in Albuquerque, New Mexico. Surgery on her right wrist in January 2009 sidelined her for over a month during her senior year. In May, Muñoz finished fourth at the NCAA Championships in Maryland to lead the Sun Devils to the 2009 NCAA team title.  She was the Edith Cummings Munson Award recipient in 2008 & 2009, the only double winner of the award. Muñoz was also 2006–08 NGCA Academic All-American, 2006–09 First-Team All-Pac-10, 2006–07 NGCA Second-Team All-American, 2009 NGCA All-American and 2009 Pac-10 Scholar of the Year. She graduated magna cum laude from ASU in May 2009 with a bachelor's degree in psychology and a minor in business.

In a final summer of amateur play, Muñoz won the match-play British Ladies Amateur in Wales over ASU teammate and compatriot Carlota Ciganda, then won gold medals (individual & team) for Spain at the 2009 Mediterranean Games in Italy. Although the runner-up in 2008, she opted not to participate in the 2009 U.S. Women's Amateur. She played in three professional majors as an amateur in 2009 and placed T-40 twice.

Professional career

2009
Muñoz turned professional in September 2009, two weeks prior to the first stage of the LPGA Tour Qualifying Tournament in California, in which she finished second and advanced to the final stage in December.

Back in Spain, she received a sponsor's exemption into the 2009 Madrid Ladies Masters, and made her professional debut on 1 October on the Ladies European Tour (LET). After shooting a 64 (−9) in the final round, she won the three-round event on the first playoff hole, defeating former ASU teammate Anna Nordqvist with an eagle putt; Muñoz earned €50,000 and a three-year LET exemption.

Following a rain-shortened one-round victory in Barcelona for €5,000 on the Banesto mini-tour in late October, Muñoz finished fifth at the LPGA Final Qualifying Tournament in December in Florida to earn full playing privileges on the LPGA Tour for 2010. She ended the year ranked 179th in the Women's World Golf Rankings.

2010
In her rookie season of 2010, Muñoz made the cut in her first eleven events, and won over $402,000 in LPGA competition with two top ten finishes. She made the top twenty in the three majors she played, was 30th on the money list, and 17th in scoring. Muñoz handily won the competition for LPGA Tour Rookie of the Year with 704 points; the runner-up was compatriot Beatriz Recari with 419.

She won an additional €26,380 in five events on the Ladies European Tour (total 2010 LET earnings were €96,633 in seven events, with €70,253 from the two events co-sanctioned by the LPGA). Muñoz ended the year at 41st in the world rankings.

2012
Muñoz notched her first LPGA Tour victory at the Sybase Match Play Championship in Gladstone, New Jersey with a 2 and 1 victory over Candie Kung.  In the semifinal round of match play against Morgan Pressel, Muñoz trailed by two through 11 holes. Pressel appeared to have won the 12th hole, which would have given her a three-hole lead over Muñoz, but a slow-play penalty was ruled against Pressel. Muñoz ended up winning the semifinal match against Pressel, 2 and 1. The victory in May vaulted Muñoz from 27th to 19th in the world rankings and from tenth to second on the 2012 money list.

Professional wins (6)

LPGA Tour (1)

LPGA Tour playoff record (0–2)

Ladies European Tour (5)

1 Muñoz sank an eagle putt on the first playoff hole to win.

Results in LPGA majors
Results not in chronological order before 2021.

^ The Evian Championship was added as a major in 2013

CUT = missed the half-way cut
NT = no tournament
T = tied

Summary

Most consecutive cuts made – 9 (2013 Evian – 2015 British Open)
Longest streak of top-10s – 1 (three times)

LPGA Tour career summary

 official through 2022 season
* Includes matchplay and other events without a cut.

World ranking
Position in Women's World Golf Rankings at the end of each calendar year.

Team appearances
Amateur
European Girls' Team Championship (representing Spain): 2001 (winners), 2002 (winners), 2003 (winners), 2004, 2005
Junior Solheim Cup (representing Europe): 2002, 2003 (winners), 2005
European Lady Junior's Team Championship (representing Spain): 2006
Espirito Santo Trophy (representing Spain): 2006, 2008
European Ladies' Team Championship (representing Spain): 2007 (winners), 2008

Professional
Solheim Cup (representing Europe): 2011 (winners), 2013 (winners), 2015, 2019 (winners)
International Crown (representing Spain): 2014 (winners)

Solheim Cup record

References

External links

Spanish female golfers
Arizona State Sun Devils women's golfers
Ladies European Tour golfers
LPGA Tour golfers
Winners of ladies' major amateur golf championships
Solheim Cup competitors for Europe
Olympic golfers of Spain
Golfers at the 2016 Summer Olympics
Golfers at the 2020 Summer Olympics
Mediterranean Games medalists in golf
Mediterranean Games gold medalists for Spain
Competitors at the 2009 Mediterranean Games
Sportspeople from Málaga
1987 births
Living people
20th-century Spanish women
21st-century Spanish women